Asche is a surname. Notable people with the surname include:

Austin Asche (born 1925), Australian judge
Cody Asche (born 1990), American baseball player
Jochen Asche (20th century), East German luger
Oscar Asche (1871–1936), Australian actor, director and writer

See also

 Asch (surname)